The 1973 Montana Grizzlies football team was an American football team that represented the University of Montana in the Big Sky Conference during the 1973 NCAA Division II football season. In their seventh year under head coach Jack Swarthout, the team compiled an 4–6 record.

Schedule

References

Montana
Montana Grizzlies football seasons
Montana Grizzlies football